This is a list of high schools in the state of Vermont.

Addison County
Middlebury Union High School, Middlebury
Mount Abraham Union High School, Bristol
Vergennes Union High School, Vergennes

Bennington County
Arlington Memorial School, Arlington
Burr and Burton Academy, Manchester (private)
Long Trail School, Dorset
Mount Anthony Union High School, Bennington

Caledonia County
Burke Mountain Academy, East Burke
Danville School, Danville
Hazen Union High School, Hardwick
Lyndon Institute, Lyndon Center
St. Johnsbury Academy, St. Johnsbury

Chittenden County
Burlington High School, Burlington
Champlain Valley Union High School, Hinesburg
Colchester High School, Colchester
Essex High School, Essex Junction
Lake Champlain Waldorf High School, Shelburne
Milton Senior High School, Milton
Mount Mansfield Union High School, Jericho
Rice Memorial High School, South Burlington
Rock Point School, Burlington
South Burlington High School, South Burlington
Trinity Baptist High School, Williston
Vermont Commons School, South Burlington
Winooski High School, Winooski

Essex County
Canaan Memorial High School, Canaan

Franklin County
Bellows Free Academy, Fairfax
Bellows Free Academy, St. Albans
Enosburg Falls Middle/High School, Enosburg Falls
Missisquoi Valley Union Middle/High School, Swanton
Richford Junior/Senior High School, Richford

Lamoille County
Lamoille Union High School, Hyde Park
Mount Mansfield Ski Club & Academy, Stowe
Peoples Academy, Morrisville
Stowe High School, Stowe

Orange County
Blue Mountain Union School, Wells River
The Mountain School, Vershire
Oxbow Union High School, Bradford
Randolph Union High School, Randolph
Thetford Academy, Thetford
Websterville Christian Academy, Websterville
Williamstown High School, Williamstown
Vermont Academy of Science and Technology, Randolph

Orleans County
Craftsbury Academy, Craftsbury
Lake Region Union High School, Orleans
North Country Union High School, Newport
United Christian Academy, Newport

Rutland County
Fair Haven Union High School, Fair Haven
Killington Mountain School, Killington
Mill River Union High School, North Clarendon
Mount St. Joseph Academy, Rutland
Otter Valley Union High School, Brandon
Poultney High School, Poultney
Proctor Junior/Senior High School, Proctor
Rutland Area Christian School, Rutland
Rutland High School, Rutland
West Rutland School, West Rutland

Washington County
Cabot School, Cabot
Green Mountain Valley School, Fayston
Harwood Union High School, Duxbury
Montpelier High School, Montpelier
Northfield High School, Northfield
Spaulding High School, Barre
Pacem School Montpelier
Twinfield Union School, Plainfield
Union 32 High School, East Montpelier

Windham County
Bellows Falls Union High School, Bellows Falls
Brattleboro Union High School, Brattleboro
The Compass School, Westminster
The Greenwood School, Putney
Leland & Gray Union High School, Townshend
Oak Meadow School, Brattleboro
The Putney School, Putney
Stratton Mountain School, Stratton Mountain
Twin Valley High School, Wilmington
Vermont Academy, Saxtons River

Windsor County
Green Mountain Union High School, Chester
Hartford High School, White River Junction
Mid Vermont Christian School, Quechee
Okemo Mountain School, Ludlow
The Sharon Academy, Sharon
Springfield High School, Springfield
White River Valley High School, South Royalton
Windsor High School, Windsor
Woodstock Union High School, Woodstock

See also 
List of school districts in Vermont

Notes

External links 
List of high schools in Vermont from SchoolTree.org

Vermont
High schools